The UK Singles Chart is one of many music charts compiled by the Official Charts Company that calculates the best-selling singles of the week in the United Kingdom. Before 2004, the chart was only based on the sales of physical singles. This list shows singles that peaked in the Top 10 of the UK Singles Chart during 1959, as well as singles which peaked in 1958 and 1960 but were in the top 10 in 1959. The entry date is when the single appeared in the top 10 for the first time (week ending, as published by the Official Charts Company, which is six days after the chart is announced).

Eighty singles were in the top ten in 1959. Eight singles from 1958 remained in the top 10 for several weeks at the beginning of the year, while "Little White Bull" by Tommy Steele, "Rawhide" by Frankie Laine, "Seven Little Girls Sitting in the Backseat" by The Avons and "Staccato's Theme" by Elmer Bernstein were all released in 1959 but did not reach their peak until 1960. "Love Makes the World Go 'Round" by Perry Como, "Tea for Two Cha Cha" by The Tommy Dorsey Orchestra starring Warren Covington and "Tom Dooley" by The Kingston Trio were the singles from 1958 to reach their peak in 1959. Nineteen artists scored multiple entries in the top 10 in 1959. Adam Faith, Anthony Newley, Johnny and the Hurricanes, Neil Sedaka
and Russ Conway were among the many artists who achieved their first UK charting top 10 single in 1959.

The 1958 Christmas number-one, "It's Only Make Believe" by Conway Twitty, remained at number-one for the first four weeks of 1959. The first new number-one single of the year was "The Day the Rains Came" by Jane Morgan. Overall, sixteen different singles peaked at number-one in 1959, with Elvis Presley, Russ Conway, Bobby Darin and Cliff Richard (2) having the joint most singles hit that position.

Background

Multiple entries
Eighty singles charted in the top 10 in 1959, with seventy-one singles reaching their peak this year. Three songs were recorded by several artists with each version reaching the top 10:

"Come Softly to Me" - Frankie Vaughan & The Kaye Sisters, The Fleetwoods
"Personality" - Anthony Newley, Lloyd Price
"Tom Dooley" - The Kingston Trio (charted 1958, peaked this year), Lonnie Donegan (peaked 1958)

Nineteen artists scored multiple entries in the top 10 in 1959. Russ Conway secured the record for most top 10 hits in 1959 with six hit singles.

Shirley Bassey was one of a number of artists with two top-ten entries, including the number-one single "As I Love You". Anthony Newley, Frankie Vaughan, Neil Sedaka and Shirley Bassey were among the other artists who had multiple top 10 entries in 1959.

Chart debuts
Twenty-six artists achieved their first top 10 single in 1959, either as a lead or featured artist.  Of these, four went on to record another hit single that year: Anthony Newley, Bobby Darin, Lloyd Price and Neil Sedaka. Russ Conway had five other entries in his breakthrough year.

The following table (collapsed on desktop site) does not include acts who had previously charted as part of a group and secured their first top 10 solo single.

Notes
Tommy Steele had his first officially credited single in 1959 without his band The Steelmen when "Come On, Let's Go" reached number 10 in January. A second single, "Little White Bull", made number 6 later in the year.

Cliff Richard's backing group previously charted under the name The Drifters, including three entries in 1959, but they changed their name to The Shadows towards the end of this year. "Travellin' Light" was the first song to reach the top 10 under their new identity, topping the chart for five weeks from 5 November.

Songs from films
Original songs from various films entered the top 10 throughout the year. These included  "Living Doll" (from Serious Charge), "Lonely Boy" (Girls Town), "The Heart of a Man" (The Heart of a Man) and "High Hopes" (A Hole in the Head).

Best-selling singles
Until 1970 there was no universally recognised year-end best-sellers list. However in 2011 the Official Charts Company released a list of the best-selling single of each year in chart history from 1952 to date. According to the list, "Living Doll" by Cliff Richard and The Drifters is officially recorded as the biggest-selling single of 1959. "What Do You Want to Make Those Eyes at Me For?" (4), "What Do You Want?" (6), "Living Doll" (7) and "It Doesn't Matter Anymore" (10) all ranked in the top 10 best-selling singles of the decade.

Top-ten singles
Key

Entries by artist

The following table shows artists who achieved two or more top 10 entries in 1959, including singles that reached their peak in 1958 or 1960. The figures include both main artists and featured artists. The total number of weeks an artist spent in the top ten in 1959 is also shown.

Notes

 "Seven Little Girls Sitting in the Backseat" reached its peak of number three on 7 January 1960 (week ending).
 "Staccato's Theme" reached its peak of number four on 21 January 1960 (week ending).
 "Tom Dooley" (Lonnie Donegan version) re-entered the top 10 at number 10 on 5 February 1959 (week ending).
 "Tom Dooley" (The Kingston Trio version) re-entered the top 10 at number 10 on 29 February 1959 (week ending).
 The Drifters changed their name to The Shadows in 1959, to avoid confusion with the American group of the same name, who also threatened legal action over the band's name after "Feelin' Fine" was released in the United States. "Travellin' Light" was the group's first top 10 entry under their new name.
 "Come On, Let's Go" re-entered the top 10 at number 10 on 22 January 1959 (week ending).
 "(All of a Sudden) My Heart Sings" re-entered the top 10 at number 10 on 19 March 1959 (week ending).
"It's Late" re-entered the top 10 at number 10 on 6 August 1959 (week ending) for 2 weeks.
 "Come Softly to Me" (Frankie Vaughan & The Kaye Sisters version) re-entered the top 10 at number 10 on 18 June 1959 (week ending).
 "I Go Ape" re-entered the top 10 at number 9 on 18 June 1959 (week ending).
 "Guitar Boogie Shuffle" re-entered the top 10 at number 10 on 25 June 1959 (week ending).
 "Personality" (Lloyd Price version) re-entered the top 10 at number 10 on 30 July 1959 (week ending).
 "Mona Lisa" re-entered the top 10 at number 10 on 29 October 1959 (week ending).
 "The Three Bells" re-entered the top 10 at number 9 on 26 November 1959 (week ending).
 "Broken Hearted Melody" re-entered the top 10 at number 10 on 3 December 1959 (week ending).
 "Rawhide" re-entered the top 10 at number 6 on 7 January 1960 (week ending) for 3 weeks.
 "Little White Bull" re-entered the top 10 at number 10 on 11 February 1960 (week ending).
 Figure includes single that peaked in 1958.
 Figure includes single that first charted in 1958 but peaked in 1959.
 Figure includes single that peaked in 1960.

See also
1959 in British music
List of number-one singles from the 1950s (UK)

References
General

Specific

External links
1959 singles chart archive at the Official Charts Company (click on relevant week)

1959 record charts
1959
1959 in British music